The Yue Fei Temple or commonly known in Chinese as Yuewang Temple is a temple built in honour of Yue Fei, a general of the Southern Song dynasty who fought against the Jurchen Jin dynasty during the Jin–Song Wars, after the capital of China moved south to Hangzhou.  The temple ground is located near the West Lake, in central Hangzhou.

The temple was first constructed during the Song dynasty in 1221 to commemorate Yue Fei. The site includes Yue Fei's Temple, Loyalty Temple and Yue Fei's Mausoleum inside.  The temple was reconstructed several times in later date.  The tombs and the tomb sculptures in the temple all date from the 12th century, and have been meticulously restored.

Gallery

See also

Media about Yue Fei
History of the Song Dynasty
Jin campaigns against the Song Dynasty
Timeline of the Jin campaigns against the Song Dynasty
Tomb of Yue Fei

Notes

Buildings and structures completed in 1221
Buildings and structures in Hangzhou
Yue Fei
Tourist attractions in Hangzhou
Traditional Chinese architecture